Rod Welsh (born 11 November 1985)  is a Paralympic swimming competitor from Australia. He was born in Melbourne, Victoria.  He won a silver medal at the 2004 Athens Games in the Men's 200 m Individual Medley SM10 event and a bronze in the Men's 100 m Backstroke S10 event.

References

Male Paralympic swimmers of Australia
Swimmers at the 2004 Summer Paralympics
Paralympic bronze medalists for Australia
Paralympic silver medalists for Australia
Living people
Medalists at the 2004 Summer Paralympics
1985 births
Paralympic medalists in swimming
Australian male backstroke swimmers
Australian male medley swimmers
S10-classified Paralympic swimmers
Swimmers from Melbourne
21st-century Australian people